Laennec may refer to:

People
 Guillaume François Laennec (1748–1882), French physician
 René Laennec (1781–1826), French physician and musician
 Laënnec Hurbon (born 1940), Haitian sociologist

Places
 Laënnec, a quarter of the 8th arrondissement of Lyon, France
 Laënnec Glacier, a glacier in the Palmer Archipelago, Antarctica

Other uses
 Doctor Laennec, a 1949 French historical drama film